George Kekewich (1530–1582) was an English politician.

He was a Member (MP) of the Parliament of England for Saltash in March 1553.

References

1530 births
1582 deaths
English MPs 1553 (Edward VI)